Hobby is a surname. Notable people with the surname include:

Alfred Marmaduke Hobby (1836–1881), American merchant, politician, and poet, and Confederate States of America military officer
Bertram Maurice Hobby (1905–1983), English entomologist
James H. Hobby (1835–1882), United States Navy officer for whom a U.S. Navy ship was named
Matt Hobby (born 1985), American actor and comedian
Oveta Culp Hobby (1905–1995), American publisher, federal government official, and Women's Army Corps officer
Sir Philip Hobby, an alternative spelling for Sir Philip Hoby (1505–1558), sometimes also spelled Sir Philip Hobbye, an English ambassador
William M. Hobby, Jr., (1899–1942), United States Navy officer killed in action during World War II for whom a U.S. Navy ship was named
William P. Hobby (1878–1964), American publisher and politician and the father of William P. Hobby, Jr.
William P. Hobby, Jr. (born 1932), American publisher and politician and the son of William P. Hobby